Westwood Junior High School may refer to:
 Westwood Jr./Sr. High School - Westwood Regional School District - Washington Township, New Jersey
 Westwood Junior High School - Richardson Independent School District - Dallas, Texas
 Westwood Junior High School - Westwood Independent School District - Palestine, Texas